Homoeogryllus orientalis (Desutter-Grandcolas, 1985), the South African bell cricket, is a species in the tribe Homoeogryllini of the subfamily Cachoplistinae. The species is reported from southern tropical Africa including parts of Mozambique and South Africa. Within South Africa it has been reported south of the tropics in the Bushveld and in the Free State.

Song

Recordings show that the male song of Homoeogryllus orientalis is almost identical to that of the related species Homoeogryllus reticulatus from the coast of tropical West Africa. Recordings of presumed orientalis in the wild in South Africa also are consistent. There is however no question of the two populations being of the same species, because there are marked differences between their genitalia.

References

Crickets
Ensifera
Orthoptera of Africa